The 2017–18 Biathlon World Cup – Stage 9 is the 9th and final event of the season and was held in Tyumen, Russia, from 22 March until 25 March 2018.

Boycott of the event 
The Canadian team announced on December 15 that they will boycott the event after the IBU decided to keep the event in Tyumen. This was followed up by the delegations from the United States and Czech Republic as well as individual boycotts from Sebastian Samuelsson from Sweden and Klemen Bauer from Slovenia. Due to the ongoing crisis in Donbass Ukraine also boycotted the event.

Schedule of events

Medal winners

Men

Women

References 

2017–18 Biathlon World Cup
Biathlon World Cup
Biathlon World Cup
Biathlon competitions in Russia
Sport in Tyumen
International sports boycotts
March 2018 events in Russia